Odey Ogar (born October 1, 1981) is a Nigerian football player.

References

1981 births
Living people
Nigerian footballers
Association football defenders
Enyimba F.C. players
Lobi Stars F.C. players